Pride is Arena's second full-length album, released in 1996. It is the first album to feature bassist John Jowitt and vocalist Paul Wrightson, but it's also guitarist Keith More's final album with the band.

The album is a continuation of their debut album, with "Crying For Help" brought to its conclusion. Even the name, "Pride", relates to the name of their debut, as a group of lions is known as a pride.

Track listing 

All songs by Nolan & Pointer

 "Welcome to the Cage..." - 4:14
 "Crying for Help V" - 2:33
 "Empire of a Thousand Days" - 9:34
 "Crying for Help VI" - 2:53
 "Medusa" - 4:28
 "Crying for Help VII" - 3:04
 "Fool's Gold" - 9:37
 "Crying for Help VIII" - 5:12
 "Sirens" - 13:42

Personnel 
Clive Nolan - Keyboards
Mick Pointer - Drums
Paul Wrightson - Vocals
Keith More - Guitars
John Jowitt - Bass

Arena (band) albums
1996 albums
SPV/Steamhammer albums